The Pavillon du Roi was a tower-like structure built in the mid-16th century at the southern end of the Lescot Wing of the Louvre Palace. On its main floor (piano nobile) was the primary apartment of the King of France. The pavilion served as a major emblem of the French monarchy for more than a century, and its design had seminal influence. From the 17th century, however, it gradually lost its visual and symbolic prominence. In the early 1640s, it was eclipsed by the slightly larger and more ornate Pavillon de l'Horloge; in the late 1660s, its main southern façade was hidden behind new structures; and in the early 19th century, its upper level was demolished and its interior arrangements were entirely remodeled.

History
 

Pierre Lescot designed the Pavillon du Roi in the context of the partial rebuilding of the Louvre initiated by Francis I in the mid-1540s and continued by Francis's successor Henry II. Its construction was started in 1553 and completed in 1556. The tall building became a kind of visual substitute for the former medieval Louvre Tower which Francis I had demolished in 1528. It had exterior façades on the west and south, for which Lescot adopted an understated design with bossaged quoins directly inspired by those designed by Antonio da Sangallo the Younger for Rome's Palazzo Farnese in the previous decade. On the ground floor, Lescot created arched windows whose design became extremely influential, in the Louvre specifically as they were copied by generations of architects including those of the Louvre Colonnade, and in French classical architecture more generally.

Inside, on the ground floor were the chambers of the Royal Council. In 1672, the Académie Française was relocated there by Jean-Baptiste Colbert.

These were accessed from the upper main room of the Lescot Wing through the king's antechamber, from which they are separated by a narrow corridor that was made accessible again during a renovation in 2021. To the east of the king's chamber was the small  and further east, the queen consort's apartment; to the west a corridor, created under Henry IV and enlarged in the 1660s, led to the Petite Galerie, Grande Galerie and Tuileries Palace.

On the second floor was an apartment which was used in the 17th century by the king's most powerful relatives or officials, successively Charles d'Albert de Luynes, Gaston d’Orléans, Cardinal Mazarin, Nicolas Fouquet and Jean-Baptiste Colbert until the court's departure to Versailles in the 1670s.

19th-century transformations

Between 1806 and 1817 the Louvre's architect Pierre Fontaine gutted the entire structure, demolished the upper levels to harmonize it with the flat-roofline design of the Louvre Colonnade, and rebuilt the interiors on entirely new plans. In 1829 he reassembled them in two rooms of the Colonnade Wing, where they are now part of the Department of Egyptian Antiquities. That room only received a permanent decoration in 1849-1851 under Fontaine's successor Félix Duban, with stucco sculptures by Francisque Joseph Duret whose delicate colors were revealed after cleaning in 2020–2021. What remains of the Pavillon du Roi has been left essentially unchanged since then.

Gallery

See also
 Medieval Louvre
 Place des Vosges and Château de Vincennes both include structures also known as

Notes

Louvre Palace
Ancien Régime French architecture